Sumo Power is a British car tuning company based in Rye, East Sussex, England.  Founded in 2002, Sumo Power specializes in custom tuning Japanese imports, including the Nissan Skyline GT-R and Mitsubishi Lancer Evolution, as well as the importation and sale of many Japanese performance parts, including being an official British distributor for HKS Europe Ltd.  

Sumo Power regularly competes in drag racing and drifting events with their tuned cars, and has recently expanded their efforts into rallying and sports car racing.  In 2009 Sumo Power merged with JR Motorsports Group (JRM), an experienced motorsport development company which already served as the official team for Mitsubishi Motors UK in the British Rally Championship.  Sumo Power and JRM now serve as the official importer of the Mitsubishi Lancer Evolution X to Britain.

In 2010, Sumo Power and JRM partnered with Nismo to serve as one of two teams representing Nissan in the inaugural FIA GT1 World Championship.  The team, entered under the Sumo Power GT title, campaigned two Nissan GT-Rs, with a line-up including British drivers Jamie Campbell-Walter, Peter Dumbreck, and Warren Hughes, as well as Nismo factory driver Michael Krumm.  Sumo Power will return for 2011 running four Nissans, with JR Motorsports representing the second squad. JR Motorsports won the Driver's Championship with Michael Krumm and Lucas Luhr, but failed to win the Team's Championship.

For 2012, the team competed in the FIA World Endurance Championship in LMP1 with an HPD ARX-03a car.

As of April 2014, Sumo Power is under new ownership and based in Littleport.

See also
 Michael Krumm
 Nissan GT-R

References

External links
 Sumo Power
 JRM Group
 JR Motorsport

Automotive motorsports and performance companies
Auto racing teams established in 2002
2002 establishments in England
FIA GT1 World Championship teams
Automotive companies of the United Kingdom
British auto racing teams
Auto tuning companies
FIA World Endurance Championship teams
ADAC GT Masters teams
British GT Championship teams

World Rallycross Championship teams
Blancpain Endurance Series teams
24 Hours of Le Mans teams